George Herbert Pethybridge  (1 October 1871, Bodmin, Cornwall, UK – 23 May 1948, Bodmin) was a British mycologist and phytopathologist, who gained an international reputation for his research on diseases of the potato species Solanum tuberosum. He is noteworthy for his 1913 discovery of the water mold species Phytophthora erythroseptica.

Biography
After secondary education at Dunheved College in Launceston, Cornwall, he matriculated at the University of London, where he graduated with a B.Sc. in 1892. From 1892 to 1897 he taught as a science master at Kingswood School in Bath and at other schools. In 1897 he went to the University of Göttingen, where he studied under the botanist and plant physiologist  (1854–1937). Pethybridge received his doctorate in 1899 with a dissertation entitled Beiträge zur Kenntnis der Einwirkung der anorganischen Salze auf die Entwicklung und den Bau der Pflanzen (Contributions to knowledge about the influence of inorganic salts on the development and structure of plants).

When Pethybridge returned from Germany, he became a staff member in the botany department of the Royal College of Science for Ireland (RCScI) under the aegis of the British Science and Art Department, which was a subdivision of the Board of Trade. (In 1900 the Board of Agriculture took over the Science and Art Department.) In the RCScI's department of botany, he worked from 1900 to 1909 as an assistant to Thomas Johnson, a professor at the Catholic University of Ireland. In 1909 Pethybridge was appointed the first head of the Seeds and Plant Diseases Division of the Board of Agriculture and Fisheries (which was from 1900 to 1903 the Board of Agriculture and then in 1919 the Ministry of Agriculture and Fisheries). From 1908 to 1923 Pethybridge held the position of Economic Botanist to the Department of Agriculture and Technical Instruction in Ireland.  From 1900 to 1923 Pethybridge and his colleagues in Dublin did important research on diseases of potato, flax, and other crop plants. Most of his scientific papers from 1900 to 1923 on phytopathology were published in The Scientific Proceedings of the Royal Dublin Society.

Two of his important papers are The Vegetation of the District Lying South of Dublin (published in 1904 in collaboration with Robert Lloyd Praeger)) and A Census Catalogue of Irish Fungi (published in 1910 in collaboration with John Adams, a professor of botany at the UCD School of Veterinary Medicine).
Shortly after the Irish Free State was established in December 1922, Pethybridge resigned his post. Early in 1923 he was appointed mycologist to the UK Ministry of Agriculture and Fisheries and assistant director of that ministry's Plant Pathology Laboratory at Harpenden. He retired from the Plant Pathology Laboratory in 1936.

At Harpenden, Pethybridge was head of the Seed Testing Station from 1923 onwards. In the later years of his career, he spent more time on administrative duties and less time on research. From 1936 to 1948 he was an editor on the publication committee of The Journal of Pomology and Horticultural Science.

In 1921 he was awarded the Boyle Medal of the Royal Dublin Society. He was elected in 1925 a Fellow of the Linnean Society of London. In 1926 he was elected to a one-year term as president of the British Mycological Society. Soon after his retirement in 1936, he was appointed Officer of the British Empire. For the last seven years of his life, he lived in Bodmin.

George Herbert Pethybridge's father was John Stranger Pethybridge (1826–1887), who was the father of 8 sons and 3 daughters. One of the daughters died in infancy. When George H. Pethybridge died in May 1948, his will was probated on 18 August 1948. His estate was bequeathed to two of his nephews with first beneficiary John Henry Pethybridge (1907–2001) and second beneficiary Walter Heather Pethybridge (1905–1994).

Selected publications
 
 
 
 
 
 
 
 
  (See Nectria mammoidea var. rubi.)

References

1871 births
1948 deaths
British mycologists
British phytopathologists
Alumni of the University of London
University of Göttingen alumni
Academics of University College Dublin
Rothamsted Experimental Station people
Fellows of the Linnean Society of London
Officers of the Order of the British Empire
People from Bodmin